The Florida State Seminoles football team competes as part of the NCAA Division I Football Bowl Subdivision (FBS), representing Florida State University in the Atlantic Division of the Atlantic Coast Conference (ACC). Since the establishment of the team in 1902, Florida State has appeared in 50 bowl games, including eighteen combined appearances in the traditional "big four" bowl games (the Rose, Sugar, Cotton, and Orange), eight Bowl Championship Series game appearances, with two victories in the BCS National Championship Game, and one appearance in the College Football Playoff. The Seminoles have appeared in ten Orange Bowls, winning five of those games.

Florida State maintains a record of 29–17–3 record in bowl games. The Seminoles played in 36 consecutive bowl games from 1982-2017, the longest streak in college football history, although the NCAA doesn't recognize this because their 2006 Emerald Bowl win and appearance were both vacated as a result of the 2007 academic scandal. 

Florida State also owns the record for the most consecutive bowl game victories with 11, between 1985 and 1996, as well as the longest unbeaten streak with a 13–0–1 record from 1982–1996.

Bowl games

✝ Bowl win vacated due to using ineligible players

References

Florida State

Florida State Seminoles bowl games